Brooklynn Snodgrass (born April 19, 1994) is a swimmer competing for Canada. She won a bronze medal in the 50 m at the 2014 Commonwealth Games in Glasgow.

References

1994 births
Canadian female swimmers
Living people
People from Estevan
Swimmers from Calgary
Sportspeople from Saskatchewan
Swimmers at the 2014 Commonwealth Games
Commonwealth Games medallists in swimming
Commonwealth Games bronze medallists for Canada
20th-century Canadian women
21st-century Canadian women
Medallists at the 2014 Commonwealth Games